Lebanon competed at the 2017 World Aquatics Championships in Budapest, Hungary from 14 July to 30 July.

Swimming

Lebanon has received a Universality invitation from FINA to send a maximum of four swimmers (two men and two women) to the World Championships.

References

Nations at the 2017 World Aquatics Championships
Lebanon at the World Aquatics Championships
2017 in Lebanese sport